The Malayan black-capped babbler (Pellorneum nigrocapitatum) is a species of bird in the family Pellorneidae.
It is found on the Malay Peninsula, Sumatra, Bangka Island, Belitung and North Natuna. This species, the Javan black-capped babbler (P. capistratum) and the Bornean black-capped babbler (P. capistratoides) were formerly considered conspecific, but were split from it in 2021. Together they were called the black-capped babbler. Its natural habitat is subtropical or tropical moist lowland forest.

References

Malayan black-capped babbler
Birds of Malesia
Malayan black-capped babbler
Malayan black-capped babbler